"Tee Off, Mr. Bean" is the twelfth episode of the British television series Mr. Bean, produced by Tiger Aspect Productions and Thames Television for Central Independent Television. It was first broadcast on ITV on 20 September 1995.

Plot

Act 1: The Laundry 
Mr. Bean goes to the launderette where he experiences a series of mishaps. Firstly, he realizes that the cost of washing has increased from £2 to £3, so he takes out another pound coin from a specially designed envelope in his trousers. A black belt thug (Grant Masters) arrives and rudely pushes Bean away into the next front-load washing machine. Bean then proceeds to put his laundry, which consists of some shirts, an inflatable toy, a lampshade, Teddy, a welcome mat, two oversized fuzzy dice and a few pairs of underpants (each labelled with a different day of the week), into the washing machine.

Bean then realizes he only placed five pairs of underwear in the machine. Bean assumes that the missing underwear is Wednesday's, then shortly after, he realizes that the current day is Wednesday, assuming that he's currently wearing the missing pair. He then stands behind a partition to change out of the Wednesday underwear to wash them, accidentally getting his trousers mixed up with a lady's skirt. As Bean, now wearing a skirt, walks past the man, this motivates the thug into taunting him. Bean then notices a pair of underwear on the floor, Sunday, realizing that the missing underwear was Sunday's, not Wednesday's. He first tries to open the washing machine to retrieve the Wednesday underwear, but the machine has already been turned on, so he simply tries to put them on, but the bully interferes by stepping on them for his own amusement.

Finally, having had enough of being bullied by the thug, Bean decides to get revenge by replacing the man's softener with a cup of black coffee from the vending machine. This works, as the man does not realize that he is pouring the coffee into the machine instead of his detergent. However, when the thug gets suspicious after sniffing the cup, Bean is forced to drink the softener to make it look as if he is drinking coffee. Later, the thug blames the launderette's manager as his martial arts gear comes out of the machine, all severely stained from the coffee.

After retrieving his mutated washing (including a shrunken Teddy) from the clothes dryer, Bean attempts to retrieve his trousers from the lady's washing by climbing into a dryer to find them just as the lady returns. Not noticing Bean is inside, the lady closes the door and turns the machine on, resulting in Bean spinning inside the dryer along with the clothes.

Act 2: The Game of Golf 
Bean heads to a golf course to play a game of mini golf. He scores a hole-in-one on the first hole, but on the second hole, he hits the ball onto the open grass. The owner (David Battley) orders him to play properly by using the club to get the ball back to the course and not with his hands. After accidentally hitting the ball outside the golf course, Bean goes on a very elaborate journey as the ball ends up on a bus, inside a lady's shopping bag (she is later seen explaining the scene to a police officer), on a boy's ice cream cone, up the exhaust pipe of a Proton Saga (causing the engine to explode), down a drain, into a litter bin, into a rubbish collection vehicle and finally onto the village green.

When Bean attempts to hitchhike back to the golf course, the first car that drives in is the blue Reliant, which Bean ignores although the unseen driver opens the door for him. When another car pulls up, Bean cuts out the patch of turf the golf ball landed on with the golf club in order to allow him to return to the course without physically touching the ball.

As the sun sets and the ending credits roll, Bean makes it back to the course just as it is closing for the day and finally rolls the ball into the second hole, before leaving with a final score of 3,427 strokes.

Cast 
 Rowan Atkinson – Mr. Bean
 Grant Masters – launderette bully
 Jacqueline Defferary – launderette woman
 David Battley – golf course owner
 Marilyn Finlay – woman driver

Production 
The opening featured a new recording of the choral theme, performed by the Choir of Christ Church Cathedral, Oxford. Act 1 was recorded at Teddington Studios before a live audience. The music of Wolfgang Amadeus Mozart is played in Act 1 too.

The Vauxhall Omega car that stops to give Bean a lift has the (already established) theme tune to The Vicar of Dibley (another Richard Curtis comedy) playing on the stereo. The music was also composed by Howard Goodall. A new version of the theme is used in the opening titles, performed by the Choir of Christ Church Cathedral, Oxford. The golf course is close to Boulters Lock in Maidenhead – just south of the junction between Ray Mead Road and Derek Road. The Village Green is in Littlewick Green near Maidenhead – also seen in the episode where Teddy enters the Pet Show. The shops where Mr. Bean attempts to putt his ball out of a lady's shopping bag are located on Shifford Crescent, Maidenhead.

Despite the Village Green and the lady's shopping bag incident taking place in Maidenhead, Bean was seen boarding a South London 405 bus when his golf ball bounces into it. This bus route runs from Redhill to West Croydon station and is many miles away from Maidenhead, even though the filming location for this scene is on Ray Mead Road, Maidenhead.

References

External links 
 

Mr. Bean episodes
1995 British television episodes
Television shows written by Rowan Atkinson
Television shows written by Robin Driscoll